The Western Dry Dock and Shipbuilding Company was a shipyard that operated at Port Arthur, Ontario, now part of Thunder Bay, on Lake Superior from 1911 to 1993. The shipyard was established in 1909 and renamed in 1916 as the Port Arthur Shipbuilding Company. The yard closed in 1993. It reopened as a repair yard Lakehead Marine and Industrial, however that venture failed in 2014. 
As of 2016, the shipyard was purchased by Heddle Marine. It is operated by Heddle Marine in partnership with Fabmar Metals Inc, of Thunder Bay. The venture focuses on ship repair services and winter layup options. 

Its dry dock and shops were constructed in 1910 and located at Bare Point at the extreme eastern end of the Thunder Bay harbour. The company built and repaired many ships during its years of operation, including warships during the First and Second World Wars.

History

Beginning
Entrepreneur James Whalen began the company in 1909. Letters patent issued at Port Arthur in February 1909 and construction began in 1910 after negotiations with The American Ship Building Company, which supplied top management and skilled workmen. The initial cost CAD$650,000. The officers at the time were James Whalen, President from 1910 to 1924; Irving S. Fenn from the American Ship Building Company, Secretary-Treasurer; and Hugh Simms, Superintendent.

The first ship to enter the dry dock was Dunelm, a cargo vessel that docked on 16 April 1911. The first passenger vessel was Hamonte, which docked on 29 July 1911. 1914 marked the launching of W. Grant Norden, later known as Donnacona, a  vessel that was completely built at Western Dry Dock.

Early 1900s
The company built many ships over next years, including warships for the First World War. In 1916, it was acquired by John Burnham of Chicago, who changed the name to Port Arthur Shipbuilding Company Limited. During the recession of the 1920s, production and employment dropped. The company was taken over by H.B. Smith and R.M. Wolvin ten years later, and business boomed during the Second World War.

Second World War
Port Arthur Shipbuilding Company constructed and delivered many ships and parts for the war. These included nine corvettes, six s 20 s, boilers and engines, and many aircraft components. Increasing business led to new buildings and equipment. The number of employees reached a peak in the July 1944 at 2150 employees (the average was 310).

Decline and end
The company was acquired by Canada Steamship Lines Limited in 1946. It continued to build ships, including three coasters, two of which were delivered to Chinese government, and six hopper barges for the French government. Major constructions ceased after 1959, though the company continued to repair and renovate ships. The company became a subsidiary of Canadian Shipbuilding and Engineering Limited in 1987 and closed in 1993. It reopened as a repair yard called Lakehead Marine and Industrial Inc., which continued to operate until 2014. Lakehead Marine and Industrial announced its bankruptcy and sold off its assets at auction in November 2014.

Purchase and re-development
Heddle Marine purchased the property in 2016 and operates as a ship repair and winter layup facility.

Grounds and facilities
There is usually  of water over the sill of the dry dock, depending on the level of Lake Superior. The dock is pumped by two  direct current pumps that can empty the dock in four hours, discharging 1,000,000 gallons per hour.

The company had modern shops for mill work, pulp and paper machinery, general machine shop work, structural steel, power and heating, boilers and tanks, iron, and brass and aluminum castings. At the time of its construction, the machine shop contained the largest vertical boring mill between Toronto, Ontario and Vancouver, British Columbia. The plant covered 35 acres and was located at the north of Lakehead Harbour.

Ships built

 Hamiltonian (steel package freighter, 1912)
 Calgarian (package freighter, 1913)
 Noronic (passenger steamer, 1913)
 Nasookin (passenger steamer, 1913)
 Sicamous (passenger steamer, 1914)
 W. Grant Morden (lake bulk carrier, 1914)
 Blaamyra (ocean freighter, 1916)
 Thorjerd (ocean freighter, 1916)

Warships built

Flower-class corvette

Bangor-class minesweeper

Algerine-class minesweeper (Royal Canadian Navy)

Algerine-class minesweeper (Royal Navy)

Bay-class minesweeper

References

External links
 List of ships built at Port Arthur Shipbuilding
 Nextlibrary features historic photographs of Northwestern Ontario, including the Western Dry Dock and Shipbuilding Company. 
 List of Western Dry Dock ship plans.

Shipbuilding companies of Canada
Former defence companies of Canada
Manufacturing companies established in 1909
Companies based in Thunder Bay
History of Thunder Bay
1909 establishments in Ontario
Manufacturing companies disestablished in 2014
2014 disestablishments in Ontario
Canadian companies established in 1909
History of shipbuilding in Ontario